The Donoho Hotel is a historic hotel in Red Boiling Springs, Tennessee, United States.  Built in 1916, the Donoho is one of three hotels remaining from the early-20th century resort boom at Red Boiling Springs, and the last of the great white frame hotels with full-length two-story verandas.  Although it has changed ownership several times, the Donoho has remained in operation continuously since its opening.  In 1986, the hotel and several outbuildings were added to the National Register of Historic Places as a historic district.

The mineral springs at Red Boiling Springs— which were thought to have curative powers— were attracting tourists as early as the 1840s.  After the Civil War, the nationwide rise in the popularity of mountain spring resorts brought about the development of a large-scale tourist industry at Red Boiling Springs.  As transportation to the remote mountain hamlet improved, more elaborate hotels were built, among them the Donoho, which was initially built in the early 1900s.  After the first Donoho Hotel burned down, the current structure was built as a replacement in 1916.  Although alterations were made to the Donoho in the 1950s to provide modern amenities, the hotel still appears much as it did when it was first constructed.

Location

Red Boiling Springs is located amid the Northern Highland Rim, a rugged upland between the Pennyroyal Plateau of Kentucky and the Nashville Basin of Tennessee. Salt Lick Creek, a tributary of the Barren River, slices a narrow valley which was once lined with a dozen hotels and at least as many boarding houses. The Donoho is situated at the base of a hill at the confluence of Salt Lick Creek and Whitley Branch. The NRHP-listed Cloyd Hotel (now the Thomas House) is located across Whitley Branch to the south. The Donoho faces East Main Street, which runs parallel to Salt Lick Creek.

The Red Boiling Springs area is underlain by a type of black shale (Chattanooga shale), which is exposed in some stream beds. As water flows over this shale, it collects and dissolves iron sulfate, giving the area's springs their once-sought after mineral potency. The most mineralized water is very salty, and has a strong hydrogen sulfide odor. Red-painted well pumps scattered throughout the town mark the location of the various mineral springs.

History

The mineral springs at Red Boiling Springs were discovered sometime in the 1830s, and by 1844 a hotel had been constructed to house tourists visiting the springs.  Due to a lack of transportation to the area (and possibly the Civil War), this early resort struggled financially.  By the 1870s, however, a new hotel had been built, and with the establishment of a stagecoach line from Gallatin, Red Boiling Springs began to thrive.  A nationwide boom in the popularity of spa resorts in the 1880s and the extension of a railroad line to nearby Hartsville in the 1890s brought still more tourists to Red Boiling Springs, and by the early 1900s the town had four hotels and a dozen or so boarding houses.

A hotel owner named Whitley built the first hotel on what is now the Donoho property sometime in the 1890s.  Around 1901, the first hotel known as the "Donoho" was built on the property by Whitley's son-in-law, Squire Donoho (1863–1908), whose family had operated a general store in Red Boiling Springs since the 1880s.  After Squire Donoho's death, the hotel and property passed into the hands of Whitley's daughter, Tennie, and her husband, Brady Chitwood (1875–1958).  The first Donoho Hotel burned in 1915, and the following year the Chitwoods built the present hotel as a replacement.

The Donoho, like other hotels in the town, offered five types of water:  freestone (unmineralized) water, "White" water, "Red" and "Black" water (high in magnesium and calcium), and the most mineralized, "Double and Twist."  Cups of the "Black" water were served as a tonic every morning on the hotel's verandas in its early years.  While many believed in the curative effects of the mineral waters, some historians suggest Victorian era tourists merely used health problems as an excuse to take long, recreational vacations.  Dancing, bowling, and swimming were common activities.  While alcoholic beverages were barred at the Donoho, numerous taverns were scattered around the periphery of Red Boiling Springs.

The Chitwoods managed the Donoho until 1955, when they sold it to Ed Hagen.  Hagen made several renovations in hopes of reviving the tourist industry at Red Boiling Springs.  The hotel has since had several owners, most notably the Walsh family, who operated the hotel from 1974 to 1993.

Design

The Donoho Hotel is a two-story weatherboard frame structure resting on a brick foundation.  The hotel is an elaborate "T" shape, with the north and south wings hanging from the ends of the T's crossbar, and the rear kitchen wing (added in the 1930s) being the T's base.  Verandas span the length of the facade and both sides of both stories.  The verandas are supported by four large columns (flanking the hotel's entrance) and twenty-two smaller columns, and contain oak tongue and groove floors.  All but one of the hotel's rooms are accessible only from the verandas.

The hotel's interior consists of a hallway which leads to a lobby, a lounge, the lone interior guest room, and a 128-capacity dining room (the dining room is in the stem of the "T").  The rear kitchen wing is accessible from the dining room and from the outside.  Along with the kitchen, the rear wing includes a room once reserved for the hotel's cook.  Private baths were added to most of the guest rooms in the 1950s.

The Donoho House, which stands immediately north of the hotel, was built in 1924 by the Chitwoods for the managers of the hotel.  The house is a two-story brick structure with a shingled hip roof and flared eaves.  The house has a full-length lower level porch and a short porch on the upper level.  The first-floor interior of the house has three dining rooms, a lobby, a kitchen area, and living quarters.  The second-floor interior contains five bedrooms.  The house is a contributing building in the historic district.

The most historically-notable outbuilding is an 1890s-era fruit cellar, built into the hillside for the property's first hotel.  Only the front of the cellar is exposed, and consists of a wooden door flanked by loose river rock.  Other outbuildings include a 1916-era washhouse (now a storage shed) and a recently constructed entertainment center, both behind the hotel.  The entertainment center now features music on the weekends with an excellent dj, video games and concessions.  The front lawn of the hotel contains two gazebos (one of which was built over a "Red" water spring) and a covered footbridge over Salt Lick Creek.  Of these outbuildings, the fruit cellar and washhouse are considered contributing structures in the historic district.

References

External links

Donoho Hotel — official site
Red Boiling Springs historic photos — contains numerous historic photos of the Donoho

Buildings and structures in Macon County, Tennessee
Hotels in Tennessee
Hotel buildings on the National Register of Historic Places in Tennessee
Historic districts on the National Register of Historic Places in Tennessee
National Register of Historic Places in Macon County, Tennessee